Koi is a village in Kotli District, Pakistan.

Populated places in Kotli District